Dunkirk is a hamlet in the rural north of South Gloucestershire, near the Gloucestershire border,  in the parish of Hawkesbury. The hamlet is on an important T-junction where the A46 (which goes from Bath to Nailsworth and Stroud) meets the A433 (which goes towards Tetbury and Cirencester).

Dunkirk in Hawkesbury parish should not be confused with Dunkirk near Nailsworth, also on the A46 in Gloucestershire, and the site of Dunkirk Mill.

The hamlet of Petty France is directly to the south. Petty France and Dunkirk were known as road accident hotspots, The proportion of fatal and serious accidents was 46%, and is significantly higher than the average for South Gloucestershire as a whole, which is 12%. 13 accidents occurred between 1 January 1998 and 31 December 2001, including 2 fatal accidents, four were serious and seven were slight., as a result of this the speed through the two hamlets was reduced to 40 MPH.

References 

Villages in South Gloucestershire District